Brown dragon or Arisaema triphyllum is a species of plant.

Brown dragon may also refer to:
Brown dragon (chromatic), a type of dragon in Dungeons & Dragons
Brown dragon (Faerûnian), a type of dragon in the Faerûnian setting of Dungeons & Dragons